Inverness Caledonian Thistle F.C. in their 13th season in Scottish football competing in the Scottish Premier League, Scottish League Cup and the Scottish Cup in season 2006–07.

Results

Scottish Premier League

Final League table

Scottish League Cup

Scottish Cup

References
caleythistleonline

Inverness Caledonian Thistle F.C. seasons
Inverness